Cyril John Vogel (January 15, 1905 – October 4, 1979) was an American prelate of the Roman Catholic Church. He served as Bishop of Salina from 1965 until his death in 1979.

Biography
The second youngest of ten children, Cyril Vogel was born in Pittsburgh, Pennsylvania, to Henry J. and Mary Agnes (née Foley) Vogel. After graduating from Duquesne University, he studied at St. Vincent's Seminary in Latrobe and was later ordained to the priesthood by Bishop Hugh Charles Boyle on June 7, 1931.

Vogel then served as a curate in Pittsburgh before becoming pastor of Sacred Heart Church in Sagamore in 1950. He was also Director of Adult Education and a member of the Diocesan Tribunal. When the Diocese of Greensburg was erected in 1951, Sacred Heart fell under its jurisdiction. He concurrently served as pastor of St. John Baptist de la Salle in Delmont and Holy Family Church at Latrobe as well as chancellor of the Greensburg Diocese. In 1960 he was named vicar general.

On April 10, 1965, Vogel was appointed the sixth Bishop of Salina, Kansas, by Pope Paul VI. He received his episcopal consecration on the following June 17 from Bishop William G. Connare, with Bishops George L. Leech and Vincent Leonard serving as co-consecrators, at the Cathedral of the Blessed Sacrament. He was installed by Archbishop Edward Joseph Hunkeler at Sacred Heart Cathedral in Salina on June 25, 1965.

He attended the final session of the Second Vatican Council, whose reforms he implemented in the diocese. During Vogel's tenure, the diocesan and parish councils, Priests' Senate, Clergy Personnel Board, Clergy Health and Retirement Association, Diocesan Liturgy and Building Commissions, and programs for education at all levels were established. He erected new churches in Hays and Minneapolis (1967), Clyde (1969), and Hoxie and Washington (1979). He also purchased two houses which were converted into a "student center" for the Catholic Student Union at the Fort Hays State University (1969).

Vogel died from a heart attack at his residence in Salina, aged 74.

References

1905 births
1979 deaths
Duquesne University alumni
Saint Vincent Seminary alumni
Religious leaders from Pittsburgh
Roman Catholic bishops of Salina
Participants in the Second Vatican Council
20th-century Roman Catholic bishops in the United States